Sarah Garstone (born 16 December 1999) is an Australian rules footballer who played for the Fremantle Football Club in the AFL Women's (AFLW).

AFLW career
Garstone was drafted by Fremantle with their fifth selection, 66th overall, in the 2019 AFL Women's draft after playing for Claremont in the WAFL Women's. In August 2020, she was delisted by Fremantle.

Personal life
Garstone and Hayley Miller are the co-hosts of Fremantle's AFLW podcast Kickin' back with Hayley and Sez.

References

External links 

Living people
1999 births
Fremantle Football Club (AFLW) players
Australian rules footballers from Western Australia